Territorial Assembly elections were held in French Ivory Coast on 30 March 1952. The result was a victory for the Democratic Party of Ivory Coast – African Democratic Rally, which won 28 of the 50 seats.

Results

References

Ivory
1952 in Ivory Coast
Elections in Ivory Coast
March 1952 events in Africa
Elections in Overseas France
Election and referendum articles with incomplete results